Clarence Spady (born July 1, 1961) is an American blues singer, songwriter and guitarist from Paterson, New Jersey. His unique musical style combines blues, jazz, funk, latin and rock. He has released three studio albums, Nature of the Beast (1996), Just Between Us (2008) and Surrender (2021). Spady's current label is Nola Blue Records.

Early years 
Spady was immersed in music from a young age; both his father (also Clarence) and his Uncle Fletchey were blues guitarists. Young Clarence took up the guitar aged five and later recalled how he “gravitated towards the blues” after learning how to play chords and solo. The family later moved to Scranton, Pennsylvania, where Spady was introduced to rock music. Throughout his teenage years he continued to experiment with guitar playing without receiving any formal training.

Early career 
On graduation, Spady worked with Greg Woods at his studio in Englewood, New Jersey. Although he was primarily tasked with odd jobs, he was eventually able to take part in recording sessions with artists such as the Johnson Family. In the early 1980s Spady toured with Touch of Class (Band) for two years, before joining Pennsylvania based singer Greg Palmer’s band for six years. In the early 1990s Spady played in Michigan funk bands for two years before returning home to Scranton.

Solo career 
Spady found little opportunity to form an R&B band in his home town so returned to his blues roots and put together the West Third Street Blues Band. For sixteen years he worked as a union operator during the day while playing music at night. The band soon started writing and recording their own songs which culminated with the 1996 release of Nature of the Beast for the Evidence Music label.  Spady was at the time listed as one of the top 40 blues artists under 40 by Living Blues, and subsequently nominated as Best New Blues Artist for the 1997 W.C. Handy Awards (now Blues Music Award). In 2008 Spady released his second album, Just Between Us with Severn Records. Once again the album was well received and was nominated for a Blues Music Award in 2009.

Surrender 
In 2021 Spady released Surrender, a strikingly personal collection reflecting on his life and career. Spady has made no secret of his battles with drugs and alcohol in the past, challenges which inspired the writing in this album. The album received favourable reviews from critics on its release, with Elmore Magazine's Jim Hynes commenting that “Spady has found his comfort zone at the intersection of Blues and Soul”.

Awards and accolades 
 1997 Blues Music Award - Nominee for Best New Blues Artist - Nature of the Beast 
 2009 Blues Music Award - Nominee for Soul Blues Album of the Year - Just Between Us 
 2020 International Songwriting Competition - 3rd place (Blues) - Surrender (single) 
 2021 Global Music Awards - Outstanding Achievement - Surrender (single)

Discography

References

1961 births
Singer-songwriters from New Jersey
Living people
American blues singer-songwriters
American blues guitarists
American male guitarists
African-American  male singer-songwriters
Guitarists from New Jersey
20th-century American guitarists
20th-century American male musicians
African-American guitarists
20th-century African-American male singers
21st-century African-American male singers